The Players Tour Championship 2011/2012 – Event 5 was a professional minor-ranking snooker tournament that took place between 21 and 25 September 2011 at the World Snooker Academy in Sheffield, England.

Andrew Higginson won his first professional title by defeating John Higgins 4–1 in the final.

Prize fund and ranking points
The breakdown of prize money and ranking points of the event is shown below:

1 Only professional players can earn ranking points.

Main draw

Preliminary rounds

Round 1
Best of 7 frames

Round 2
Best of 7 frames

Main rounds

Top half

Section 1

Section 2

Section 3

Section 4

Bottom half

Section 5

Section 6

Section 7

Section 8

Finals

Century breaks 
Only from last 128 onwards. 

 141, 105  David Gilbert
 138, 128, 112, 107  Neil Robertson
 137  Liu Song
 137  Dave Harold
 135, 129  Mark King
 133, 115, 107  Barry Hawkins
 132, 108  Michael Holt
 132  Michael White
 128, 112  Martin Gould
 126, 113  Jimmy Robertson
 125, 100  Ryan Day
 125  Shaun Murphy
 125  Anthony McGill
 117, 105  Graeme Dott
 117  Andrew Higginson
 115, 102  Robert Milkins
 114  Thanawat Thirapongpaiboon

 114  Liu Chuang
 113  Robbie Williams
 113  John Sutton
 110, 102  Ken Doherty
 110  Jamie Burnett
 108  Paul Davison
 106, 100  Tom Ford
 106  Matthew Selt
 105, 105, 103  John Higgins
 105  Ding Junhui
 104  Rory McLeod
 103  Judd Trump
 102  Ricky Walden
 102  Sam Baird
 101  Barry Pinches
 101  Alan McManus
 100  Gerard Greene

References 

05
2011 in English sport
September 2011 sports events in the United Kingdom